The Mother Teresa Monument is a public art work by artist Guatam Pal. It is located on the west side of the St. Joan of Arc Chapel on the Marquette University campus in downtown Milwaukee, Wisconsin. The sculpture depicts Mother Teresa dressed in a sari and holding an infant. The sculpture commemorates Mother Teresa's 1981 visit to Marquette, when she was awarded the Pere Marquette Discovery Award. The sculpture was dedicated on October 6, 2009, as part of a weeklong celebration of the "Centennial of Women at Marquette."

References

2009 establishments in Wisconsin
2009 sculptures
Bronze sculptures in Wisconsin
Marquette University
Memorials to Mother Teresa
Monuments and memorials in Wisconsin
Outdoor sculptures in Milwaukee
Sculptures of children in the United States
Sculptures of women in Wisconsin
Statues in Wisconsin